Vlogger is a 2011  political thriller produced by Zentropa International Spain. The film, shot in the Catalan language, features heavy use of machinima.

Plot
The film centers on Tania a Pakistani-born computer specialist working in Barcelona who learns that her missing twin brother Osman has returned to playing the video game Half-Life (series). Soon she learns the terrible truth that her brother has been recruited into a terrorist organization and plans to become a suicide bomber. With just six days before his terrorist mission takes place she begins exploring the virtual world of Half-Life using an avatar in order to find him and prevent the bombing.

Production
The film combines animated footage shot inside virtual worlds (Machinima) with live footage from webcams and has a strong transmedia element. The project was possible thanks to winning an ICAA New Media Fund 2010 Competition. It was the debut film of Catalan born director Ricard Gras.

International distribution was handled by Trust Nordisk (http://www.nordiskfilm.com/).

Post-release
Vlogger ran at the 2011 Sitges Film Festival in Sitges, Catalonia.

References

External links
 Mention of the movie at the Tribeca Future of Film series
 Official Press release
 Cahiers du Cinema announces full page release on movie
 Internet Movie Database
 Vlogger premiere to take place at Sitges

2010s mockumentary films
Machinima works
Catalan-language films
Spanish thriller films
2011 films